A Mother's Son is a British crime drama television mini-series, created by Chris Lang, which was first broadcast on ITV1 on 4 and 5 September 2012. The series was produced by the ITV Studios. Hermione Norris, Martin Clunes, Paul McGann, Nicola Walker and Alexander Arnold star as the main protagonists of the series.

In 2015, A Mother's Son was adapted by Didier Le Pêcheur for French television in a co-production between EuropaCorp Television and ITV Studios France under the title Tu es mon fils. The French version, starring Anne Marivin, Thomas Jouannet and Charles Berling, first aired on TF1 on 23 February 2015, garnering 6.5 million viewers.

Plot
Lorraine Mullary, a local schoolgirl, goes missing and is later found murdered, throwing the sleepy Suffolk market town of Eastlee in which she lived into turmoil. Among them are the newly merged family of Rosie (Hermione Norris) and Ben (Martin Clunes) and their four children. Rosie begins to worry about son Jamie (Alexander Arnold), suspecting him of lying to her about his movements on the night of Lorraine's murder. When she finds a stained pair of trainers hidden in his bedroom, she worries the stains might be blood. As the investigation continues, relationships in the family become strained. Jamie turns for support to his father David (Paul McGann). But Rosie finds she cannot suppress the growing fear that her son might be guilty of something truly terrible.

Recording
The series was filmed in and around the town of Southwold in Suffolk (just ten miles south of Britain's most easterly point, Lowestoft), as well as the nearby village of Walberswick. Shops on Southwold high street became the backdrop for many scenes, with local residents given the chance to appear as extras to keep the plot as close to life as possible. A Mother's Son became the second drama series to be filmed in the town, following Michael Palin's East of Ipswich which was filmed and broadcast in 1987.
Several scenes are also filmed in the Hertfordshire village of Kings Langley.

Cast
 Hermione Norris as Rosie Cutler
 Martin Clunes as Ben Banks
 Paul McGann as David Cutler
 Alexander Arnold as Jamie Cutler
 Ellie Bamber as Olivia 'Livvy' Cutler
 Jake Davies as Rob Banks
 Antonia Clarke as Jess Banks
 Juliet Yorke as Lorraine Mullary
 Annabelle Apsion as Kay Mullary
 Nicola Walker as D.C. Sue Upton
 Charles Daish as D.C.I. Thomas McCleish

Episodes

Reception
Reviewing the series in The Guardian Sam Wollaston called it "tense, absorbing, thrilling". Nigel Farndale, writing in The Telegraph praised it as "a taut, psychological thriller that will have left every parent who watched it feeling uneasy, maybe even culpable," while Alex Hardy in The Times was impressed by "A striking portrait of the asymmetrical compartmentalised nature of one family of our times."

References

External links

A Mother's Son on ITV

2012 British television series debuts
2012 British television series endings
2010s British crime television series
2010s British television miniseries
British detective television series
English-language television shows
ITV television dramas
Television series by ITV Studios
Television shows set in Suffolk
2010s British drama television series